Rea Galanaki is a Greek author who was born in Heraklion, Crete in 1947. She studied history and archaeology at the University of Athens. She has published novels, short stories, essays and poetry books.

Her six novels (The life of Ismail Ferik Pasha, I shall sigh aw Louis, Eleni or Nobody, The Century of Labyrinths, Silent deep sea, Jouda’s Fires and Oedipus ’ Ashes) have established her as one of the leading Greek novelists. She  has touched subjects as the double identities, the division between two countries, the impossibility of nostos, the meaning of nationality or femininity, of history itself; close to these, and during last years, she has been focused at subjects as the reappearance of racism, fascism, crisis and the contemporary social changes. 
She is widely known for her unique, thoughtful and sensitive way of writing.  Her prose is recognized at her novels, based either on up to day, or on historical problems. She is also considered as the renovator of the so called historical novel.  
Critical essays on Rhea Galanaki’s works have been published not only in Greek newspapers and literature magazines, but, among others, in the T.L.S.(2004, on the occasion of Olympic Games), in Le Monde and Le Soir (1992), the Frankfurter Allgemeine Zeitung, Sudwest Presse, Frankfurter Rundschau (2002).

Her novels have been translated in 15 languages: English, French, German, Spanish, Italian, Ukrainian, Dutch, Czech, Catalan, Bulgarian, Swedish, Lithuanian, Turkish, Arab, Chinese, Hebrew and Albanian.

Awards
 1999 National Award for Literature
 2004 National Academy Award
 2005 National Award for Literature
 2006 Reader's Choice Award of the National Book Center of Greece

Selected bibliography

Books
(1975). Πλην εύχαρις. Athēna: "Olkos". 
(Yet Joyful, Athēna : "Olkos" Press)

(1979). Τα ορυκτά. Athēna: Diogienēs. 
(The Minerals,  Athēna: Diogienēs Press)

(1980). Το κέικ. Εκδόσεις Κέδρος, 
(The cake, Agra Press)

 (1986). Πού ζει ο λύκος;. Εκδόσεις Άγρα. 
(Where Does the Wolf Live, Agra Press)

 (1993). Θα υπογράφω Λουί. Άγρα. 
& Kolias, H. D. (translator). (2000). I shall sign as Loui. Evanston, Ill: Northwestern University Press. . 

 (1994). Πλην εύχαρις. Τα ορυκτά. Άγρα. 
(Yet Joyful. The Minerals. Agra Press)

 (1997). Ομόκεντρα διηγήματα. Άγρα. 
(Homo-centric Stories. Agra Press)

 (1997). Βασιλεύς ή στρατιώτης. Άγρα. 
(King or Soldier. Agra Press)

 (1998). Ελένη ή ο Kανένας. Άγρα. 
(Eleni, or, Nobody. Agra Press).

 (2002). Ο βίος του Ισμαήλ Φερίκ Πασά. Άγρα. 
& Kaiē Tsitselē (translator). (1996). The life of Ismail Ferik Pasha: spina nel cuore. London: P. Owen. 

 (2002). Ο αιώνας των λαβυρίνθων. Εκδόσεις Καστανιώτη. 
(The Age of the Labyrinths. Kastaniotis Press)

 (2004). Ένα σχεδόν γαλάζιο χέρι. Εκδόσεις Καστανιώτη. 
(An Almost Blue Hand. Kastaniotis Press)

 (2004). Ελένη ή ο Κανένας. Εκδόσεις Καστανιώτη. 
& Connolly, D (translator). (2003). Eleni, or, Nobody. Evanston, Ill: Northwestern University Press. . 

 (2005). Θα υπογράφω Λουί. Εκδόσεις Καστανιώτη. 
(I shall sign as Loui. Agra Press)

  (2006). Αμίλητα. βαθιά νερά. Εκδόσεις Καστανιώτη.   
(Deep. Silent Waters. Kastaniotis Press)

 (2007). Θα υπογράφω Λουί. Εκδόσεις Καστανιώτη. 
(I shall sign as Loui. Agra Press)

 (2008). Ποιήματα. Εκδόσεις Καστανιώτη. 
(Poems. Kastaniotis Press)

 (2009). Φωτιές του Ιούδα. Στάχτες του Οιδίποδα. Εκδόσεις Καστανιώτη. 
(Fires of Judas. Ashes of Oedipus. Kastaniotis Press)

 (2011). Ο αιώνας των λαβυρίνθων. Έθνος Εκδόσεις Καστανιώτη. 
(The Age of the Labyrinths. Kastaniotis Press)

 (2011). Από τη ζωή στη λογοτεχνία. Εκδόσεις Καστανιώτη. 
(From Life to Literature. Kastaniotis Press)

 (2015). Η άκρα ταπείνωση. Εκδόσεις Καστανιώτη. 
(Absolute Humiliation. Kastaniotis Press)

Participation in collective works

(2013). Συνταγές μέσα από τη λογοτεχνία. Δημοσιογραφικός Οργανισμός Λαμπράκη. 
 (2012). 6 φωνές, 6 γυναίκες. Γενική Γραμματεία Ισότητας των Φύλων. 
 (2011). Jean Altamouras. Benaki Museum. 
 (2011) . Ο κύκλος του βιβλίου: Ο συγγραφέας, ο επιμελητής-τυπογράφος, ο εκδότης, ο κριτικός, ο αναγνώστης. Σχολή Μωραΐτη. Εταιρεία Σπουδών Νεοελληνικού Πολιτισμού και Γενικής Παιδείας [εισήγηση].   
 (2007). Μετά το '89. Εκδόσεις Γαβριηλίδης.  
 (2007). Συγγραφικές εμμονές. Εκδόσεις Καστανιώτη.   
 (2007). Σύγχρονη ερωτική ποίηση. Εκδόσεις Καστανιώτη.  
 (2005). Ο δρόμος για την Ομόνοια. Εκδόσεις Καστανιώτη. 
(The Road to Omonia, Kastaniotis Press)

 (2005). Πάτρα, το πρόσωπο της πόλης. Εκδόσεις Τοπίο. 
 (Patra, the Face of the City, Topio Publications)

 (1997). Ιστορική πραγματικότητα και νεοελληνική πεζογραφία 1945-1995. Σχολή Μωραΐτη. Εταιρεία Σπουδών Νεοελληνικού Πολιτισμού και Γενικής Παιδείας [εισήγηση].

References

Further reading

1947 births
Greek women novelists
Living people